Ada Eyetoaq (alternatively: Eyetoaq Eyetoaq, Ada Eyetoaq, Kingilik Eyetoaq, Iyi'tuaq Eyetoaq, Eeyeetoaq Eyetoaq, Eyeetoaq Eyetoaq, Eeyeetowak Eyetoaq, Iyi'tag Eyetoaq, Eetoowa Eyetoaq, Eyittuak Eyetoaq, Eeyeeteetowak Eyetoaq, Iti'tuaq, Eeeyeetowa, Eda) was born in 1934 and died in 2014.  She was a Baker Lake (Nunavut) Inuit who produced traditional Inuit art. She is primarily known for her miniature soapstone sculptures.

Personal life 
Eyetoaq married James Kingilik, also a soapstone sculptor, in the early 1950s. They had seven children, five biological and two adopted. In 1968 they moved from their traditional Inuit camp at Beverly Lake to the Baker Lake settlement. After moving, they lived in a tent for two months due to a lack of housing. It was around this time that the couple began their work as sculptors in order to supplement their incomes.

Art 
Besides her sculptures, Eyetoaq also created drawings, prints, wool duffels, and felt wall hangings. But, her carvings are what have brought her notoriety, especially those involving the human form. She began carving in the 1970s and became one of Baker Lake's most respected female artists. Her work has been auctioned at a wide range of prices from the 100s to the 1000s.

Soapstone Sculptures 
Eyetoaq drew inspiration from her family's traditional Inuit background, especially the hunting and trapping aspects of her culture. Her carvings are primarily of human figures, but she also did work representing animals such as bears, fish, or birds. Often her work more specifically represents women, or mothers with children.

Collections 

 Amon Carter Museum of American Art
 Canada Council Art Bank: Ottawa
 Canadian Museum of History
 Clifford E. Lee Collection, University of Alberta: Edmonton
 Inuit Cultural Institute: Rankin Inlet
 Macdonald Stewart Art Centre
 Musee des beaux-arts de Montreal
 Museum of Anthropology, University of British Columbia: Vancouver
 Prince of Wales Northern Heritage Centre: Yellowknife
 Red Deer and District Museum and Archives: Red Deer
 University of Alberta: Edmonton
 Winnipeg Art Gallery

Publications 
Ada Eyetoaq: Recent Sculpture/Sculpture Récente, 1979 Canadian Arctic Producers Cooperative Ltd.

References 

Wikipedia Student Program
1934 births
2014 deaths
Inuit artists
Inuit sculptors